"Tonight, Tonight, Tonight" is the second track on the 1986 album Invisible Touch by Genesis, released in March 1987 as the fourth single from the album. It peaked at No. 3 in the US and No. 18 in the UK. The working title was "Monkey, Zulu".

The single included an edited version (at 4:32) and the first part of "Domino" ("In the Glow of the Night") as the B-side. A new edit of the single version was released on the 1999 compilation Turn It On Again: The Hits (as well as its "sequel" The Tour Edition) and later on The Platinum Collection. This revised edit features a different cross fade and different edit points as compared to the original 1987 edit version. Some singles that included the full version of the song included the second part of "Domino" ("The Last Domino") as the B-side. Other releases contained the song "Paperlate" and a 12" remix of "Tonight, Tonight, Tonight". The full live version from the Live at Wembley Stadium video was included as a B-side on the "Never A Time" CD single.

The song was performed during concerts in support of Invisible Touch. A shorter version (which segued into "Invisible Touch") was played on the We Can't Dance, Turn It On Again, and The Last Domino? tours, albeit transposed down a key to account for the deepening of Phil Collins's voice.

Cash Box said it has a "remote, eery...ambiance that features Phil Collins' emotional singing and propulsive drumming."

The song was used in a beer advertisement.

Music video
The music video for the song was shot in the Bradbury Building in Los Angeles.

Track listing
7": Virgin / GENS 4 United Kingdom
 "Tonight, Tonight, Tonight" (Edit) – 4:32
 "In The Glow of the Night" (Part One)

12": Virgin / GENSG 4–12 United Kingdom
 "Tonight, Tonight, Tonight" (Edit) – 4:32
 "In The Glow of the Night" (Part One)
 "Tonight, Tonight, Tonight" (12" Potoker Remix)
 gatefold sleeve

12": Virgin / GENS 4–12 United Kingdom
 "Tonight, Tonight, Tonight" (Edit) – 4:32
 "In The Glow of the Night" (Part One)
 "Paperlate"
 "Tonight, Tonight, Tonight" (12" Potoker Remix)

CD: Virgin / CDEP1 United Kingdom
 "Tonight, Tonight, Tonight" (Edit) – 4:32
 "In The Glow Of The Night" (Domino 'Part One')
 "Paperlate"
 "Tonight, Tonight, Tonight" (12" Potoker Remix)
Note: A rare withdrawn UK CD-single contained "Invisible Touch" (Extended Remix)" instead of "Paperlate"

Personnel
 Tony Banks – keyboards, synth bass 
 Phil Collins – vocals, drums, LinnDrum, Simmons SDS-V, percussion 
 Mike Rutherford – electric guitars

Charts

Weekly charts

Year-end charts

References

External links
 Music Video at VH1 Classic

1986 songs
1987 singles
Genesis (band) songs
Song recordings produced by Hugh Padgham
Songs written by Phil Collins
Songs written by Mike Rutherford
Songs written by Tony Banks (musician)
Atlantic Records singles
Virgin Records singles